Evening Shade is an American sitcom that aired on CBS from September 21, 1990, to May 23, 1994. The series stars Burt Reynolds as Woodrow "Wood" Newton, an ex-professional football player for the Pittsburgh Steelers, who returns to rural Evening Shade, Arkansas, to coach a high-school football team with a long losing streak. Reynolds personally requested to use the Steelers as his character's former team because he was a fan.

The general theme of the show is the appeal of small-town life. Episodes often ended with a closing narration by Ossie Davis, as his character Ponder Blue, summing up the events of the episode, always closing with "... in a place called Evening Shade." The opening segment included clips from around Arkansas, including the famous McClard's Bar-B-Q, which is situated on Albert Pike Boulevard and South Patterson Street in Hot Springs National Park.

Summary

A former pro football player for the Pittsburgh Steelers who quit due to injury, Wood Newton has settled down to a quiet life as the coach of the Evening Shade High School football team, which is notorious for its long losing streak. 

Wood and his wife Ava, whom he married when she was only 18 (a frequently voiced grievance made by her father Evan Evans, owner of the local newspaper) are devoted to each other despite their age difference. Ava is an ambitious, successful practicing lawyer who in the first season is elected District Attorney while pregnant with their fourth (unintended) child, Emily, who is born in the first season finale. Among Wood and Ava's closest friends are the somewhat-older town doctor Harlan Eldridge and his trusting wife Merleen, who always believes the best of people.

The show's plots focus on the various difficulties that Wood faces in living a very different life than he ever expected, as well as the obvious family pressures of two jobs and four children. Additional tensions come from Ava's aunt Frieda, Evan's perennially discontented sister, who especially disapproves when Evan begins dating town stripper Fontana Beausoleil, who discovers in season two that she is the long-lost daughter Merleen gave up for adoption when she was 15. Evan and Fontana get married in a three-part episode in season two and have a child in season three. 

The show also gets mileage out of the incongruity of the decidedly unathletic, but well-meaning assistant coach Herman Stiles, the best the school's budget can afford. During the first season, he catches the eye of Evening Shade High's prim and proper principal, Margaret Fouch, and they start dating.

On July 12 and 19, 1993, CBS aired two parts of an hour-long pilot, Harlan & Merleen, as a proposed spin-off of the series. The pilot had the Eldridges open their home to young pregnant women who needed help (one of whom was played by Leah Remini). The pilot did not achieve series status.

Characters

Main
Woodrow "Wood" Newton (Burt Reynolds)
Ava Evans Newton (Marilu Henner)
Evan Evans (Hal Holbrook)
Ponder Blue (Ossie Davis)
Dr. Harlan Eldridge (Charles Durning)
Herman Stiles (Michael Jeter)
Taylor Newton (Jay R. Ferguson)
Molly Newton (Melissa Renée Martin, season 1), (Candace Hutson, seasons 2-4)
Will Newton (Jacob Parker)
Nub Oliver (Charlie Dell)
Frieda Evans (Elizabeth Ashley)
Merleen Eldridge (Ann Wedgeworth)
Fontana Beausoleil (Linda Gehringer)
Margaret Fouch (Ann Hearn)

Recurring
Dorothy (Jane Abbott)
Virgil (Burton Gilliam)
Andrew Phillpot (David A. R. White), Taylor's best friend
Neal "Thor" Heck (Pepper Sweeney, 1991–93)
Aimee Thompson (Hilary Swank, 1991–92), (Ari Meyers, 1992–93), Taylor's girlfriend
Irma Wallingsford (Alice Ghostley, 1992–94)
Daisy (Leah Remini, 1993), Taylor's girlfriend after his break-up with Aimee, a New York transplant
Wanda (Wanda Jones, 1993–94), waitress at Blue's Bar-B-Que Villa
Emily Newton (Alexa PenaVega, 1993–94), Ava and Wood's youngest child, who appears as a 5-year-old in the final season

Episode list

Production 

The show's production company, Mozark Productions, was a joint venture by creator Linda Bloodworth-Thomason of Missouri and her husband, Arkansas native, Harry Thomason, which concurrently produced another successful show set in the South, Designing Women. Hal Holbrook's Designing Women character was killed off to free the actor to star in the newer program. The series was produced in association with CBS Productions, Burt Reynolds Productions, and MTM Enterprises. CBS retained full ownership of the series while MTM syndicated the series in the United States.

Release

Home media 
On July 15, 2008, CBS DVD/Paramount Home Entertainment released the first season on DVD, albeit with redone music and editing.

On April 12, 2019, Visual Entertainment released the complete series on DVD in Region 1 for the first time.

Reception 
The series enjoyed strong ratings during its entire run, hitting its peak in season two with a number 15 Nielsen ranking. At the time, this was a notably higher position than The Cosby Show, which had recently fallen from a five-year streak as TV's number-one program. Evening Shade was still a top-30 performer, after CBS cancelled the series in May 1994. Skyrocketing production costs, mainly attributed to the large salaries of the show's top-caliber, all-star cast, were the primary reason given for the cancellation (which was confirmed by Marilu Henner in her September 1994 appearance on Charlie Rose). However, some have speculated that the show's ending was a decision made by Reynolds, rather than CBS, as his recent marriage troubles with Loni Anderson (from whom he was divorced in 1993) were thought to have affected his work.

After its cancellation, reruns of Evening Shade were picked up by The Family Channel; however, due to the network's conservative censorship standards, only 40 of the series' 101 episodes produced were aired by FAM, which were also edited considerably from their original broadcast versions.

Nielsen ratings

References

External links

1990s American sitcoms
1990 American television series debuts
1994 American television series endings
American football television series
CBS original programming
English-language television shows
Pittsburgh Steelers in popular culture
Primetime Emmy Award-winning television series
Television series about families
Television series by CBS Studios
Television series by MTM Enterprises
Television series created by Linda Bloodworth-Thomason
Television shows set in Arkansas